The North-Western Provinces was an administrative region in British India. The North-Western Provinces were established in 1836, through merging the administrative divisions of the Ceded and Conquered Provinces. In 1858, the Nawab-ruled kingdom of Oudh was annexed and merged with the North-Western Provinces to form the renamed North-Western Provinces and Oudh. In 1902, this province was reorganized to form the United Provinces of Agra and Oudh. Allahabad served as its capital from 1858, when it also became the capital of India for a day.

Area

The province included all divisions of the present-day state of Uttar Pradesh with the exception of the Lucknow Division and Faizabad Division of Awadh. Among other regions included at various times were: the Delhi Territory, from 1836 until 1858, when the latter became part of the Punjab Province of British India; Ajmer and Merwara, from 1832 and 1846, respectively, until 1871, when Ajmer-Merwara became a minor province of British India; and the Saugor and Nerbudda Territories from 1853 until 1861, when they were absorbed into the Central Provinces.

Administration
The North Western Provinces was governed by a Lieutenant-Governor, who was appointed by the East India Company from 1836 to 1858, and by the British Government from 1858 to 1902.

In 1856, after the annexation of Oudh State, the North Western Provinces became part of the larger province of North Western Provinces and Oudh.  In 1902, the latter province was renamed the United Provinces of Agra and Oudh; in 1904, the region within the new United Provinces corresponding to the North Western Provinces was renamed the Agra Province.

See also
 List of chief commissioners of Oudh
 List of lieutenant-governors of the North-Western Provinces
 List of lieutenant-governors of the North-Western Provinces and chief commissioners of Oudh
Company rule in India
British Raj
United Provinces of Agra and Oudh

Notes

References

1836 establishments in British India
1902 disestablishments in British India
Subdivisions of British India
British administration in Uttar Pradesh